Sylvester and the Magic Pebble is a children's picture book written and illustrated by William Steig, and published in 1969. The book received the Caldecott Medal in 1970.

Plot 
Sylvester Duncan, a young donkey from the fictional community of Oatsdale, collects pebbles "of unusual shape and color." One day he finds a spherical red pebble that grants wishes. Immediately afterward, a lion scares Sylvester, and as a defense he wishes himself into a rock--the only thing he could think of at the moment. Unfortunately, the magic pebble falls off the rock, and Sylvester is unable to revert to his donkey form as the pebble must be in contact with the wish-maker to work. The rest of the story deals with the resulting aftermath: Sylvester's personal attempt to change back into his true self and Mr. and Mrs. Duncan's search for their only child.

Awards 
Sylvester and the Magic Pebble earned Steig the 1970 Caldecott Medal, his first of many Caldecott and Newbery Medal honors. The book was nominated for the 1970 National Book Award for Young People's Literature (losing out to Isaac Bashevis Singer's A Day of Pleasure).  In 1978, Sylvester and the Magic Pebble was given the Lewis Carroll Shelf Award.

In popular culture 
The book was also featured on an episode of Between the Lions.

In 1993, Weston Woods Studios adapted this book to an animated movie, narrated by John Lithgow and directed by Gene Deitch, with music by Steig's son, jazz flautist Jeremy Steig.

Controversy 
The book sparked some controversy, for its portrayal of the police as pigs, and as a result was not stocked by public schools and libraries in parts of the United States.

References

External links

1969 children's books
American picture books
Books by William Steig
Caldecott Medal–winning works
Children's fiction books
Children's novels about animals
Fiction about shapeshifting
Fictional donkeys
Literature controversies